Cameron Morrah (born March 18, 1987) is a former American football tight end who played in the National Football League and Canadian Football League. He was drafted in the seventh round of the 2009 NFL Draft, by the Seattle Seahawks. He played college football at California.

Morrah was a standout defensive end and tight end at Claremont High where he helped lead his team to 3 straight Baseline League championships, racking up honors as a 3-time first-team All Baseline League Selection, 3-time All CIF Southern Section Selection, team MVP, 13th ranked defensive end in the nation, rated 28th best player in the state of California, 60th best in the Far West Region, 4 stars by Rivals, and was a Parade All American. Making him one of the top recruits for the Golden Bears 2005 recruiting class.

College career

Morrah played college football at California, where he led the Golden Bears in touchdown receptions in the 2008 season with 8.  After receiving a touchdown pass from QB Nate Longshore on December 6, 2008 vs Washington, Morrah became the school's single season touchdown record holder for tight ends.

Professional career
Drafted by the Seattle Seahawks in 2009. He made his debut on opening day September 13, 2009 vs the St. Louis Rams and recorded his first reception 2 weeks later on September 27, 2009 vs the Chicago Bears. 2010 was Morrah's best year as a Seahawk he appeared in 15 games and became solid target late in the season. After being injured in the playoffs Morrah started his 2011 campaign on the teams P.U.P list while recovering from a foot surgery.  That season, he played in 9 games with 3 starts. After being hampered by foot problems he was placed on the teams IR just before the 2012 season.

Denver Broncos
Morrah, along with seven other players, were signed to future contracts with the Denver Broncos on January 22, 2014.

BC Lions 
On April 8, 2015 Morrah signed with BC Lions of the Canadian Football League. BC Lions head coach Jeff Tedford was Morrah's head coach while at Cal.

References

External links
Seattle Seahawks bio
California Golden Bears bio

1987 births
Living people
Sportspeople from Pomona, California
African-American players of American football
Players of American football from California
American football tight ends
California Golden Bears football players
Seattle Seahawks players
San Francisco 49ers players
Denver Broncos players
21st-century African-American sportspeople
20th-century African-American people